Mele is a comune (municipality) in the Province of Genoa in the Italian region of Liguria.

Mele may also refer to:

People

Surname
 Alfred Mele (born 1951), American philosopher
 Alphonse van Mele (1891–1972), Belgian gymnast
 Casandra Stark Mele, American film director
 Nicholas Mele, American actor
 Sam Mele (1922–2017), American baseball player, manager, coach and scout

Given name
 Mélé Temguia (born 1995), Canadian soccer player
 Mele Tuilotolava, Tongan-New Zealand lawyer
 Mele "Mel" Vojvodich (1929–2003), American aviator

Places
 Mele Island, an island in the Shefa province of Vanuatu
 Mele, Maharashtra, a village in Ratnagiri district, Maharashtra state in Western India
 Myla, Russia, or Mele

Other
 Mele (Hawaiian term), a Hawaiian term for chants, songs, or poems

See also
 Male (disambiguation)
 Mel (disambiguation)
 Mele-on
 Melee (disambiguation)
 Meles (disambiguation)